Cyberpunk is a subgenre of science fiction in a dystopian futuristic setting that tends to focus on a "combination of lowlife and high tech", featuring futuristic technological and scientific achievements, such as artificial intelligence and cybernetics, juxtaposed with societal collapse, dystopia or decay. Much of cyberpunk is rooted in the New Wave science fiction movement of the 1960s and 1970s, when writers like Philip K. Dick, Michael Moorcock, Roger Zelazny, John Brunner, J. G. Ballard, Philip José Farmer and Harlan Ellison examined the impact of drug culture, technology, and the sexual revolution while avoiding the utopian tendencies of earlier science fiction.

Comics exploring cyberpunk themes began appearing as early as Judge Dredd, first published in 1977. Released in 1984, William Gibson's influential debut novel Neuromancer helped solidify cyberpunk as a genre, drawing influence from punk subculture and early hacker culture. Other influential cyberpunk writers included Bruce Sterling and Rudy Rucker. The Japanese cyberpunk subgenre began in 1982 with the debut of Katsuhiro Otomo's manga series Akira, with its 1988 anime film adaptation (also directed by Otomo) later popularizing the subgenre.

Early films in the genre include Ridley Scott's 1982 film Blade Runner, one of several of Philip K. Dick's works that have been adapted into films (in this case, Do Androids Dream of Electric Sheep?). The "first cyberpunk television series" was the TV series Max Headroom from 1987, playing in a futuristic dystopia ruled by an oligarchy of television networks, and where computer hacking played a central role in many story lines. The films Johnny Mnemonic (1995) and New Rose Hotel (1998), both based upon short stories by William Gibson, flopped commercially and critically, while The Matrix trilogy (1999–2003) and Judge Dredd (1995) were some of the most successful cyberpunk films.

Newer cyberpunk media  includes Blade Runner 2049 (2017), a sequel to the original 1982 film; Dredd (2012), which was not a sequel to the original movie; Upgrade (2018); Alita: Battle Angel (2019), based on the 1990s Japanese manga Battle Angel Alita; the 2018 Netflix TV series Altered Carbon, based on Richard K. Morgan's 2002 novel of the same name; the 2020 remake of 1997 role-playing video game Final Fantasy VII; and the video game Cyberpunk 2077 (2020), based on R. Talsorian Games's 1988 tabletop role-playing game Cyberpunk.

Background 
Lawrence Person has attempted to define the content and ethos of the cyberpunk literary movement stating: 

Cyberpunk plots often center on conflict among artificial intelligences, hackers, and megacorporations, and tend to be set in a near-future Earth, rather than in the far-future settings or galactic vistas found in novels such as Isaac Asimov's Foundation or Frank Herbert's Dune. The settings are usually post-industrial dystopias but tend to feature extraordinary cultural ferment and the use of technology in ways never anticipated by its original inventors ("the street finds its own uses for things"). Much of the genre's atmosphere echoes film noir, and written works in the genre often use techniques from detective fiction. There are sources who view that cyberpunk has shifted from a literary movement to a mode of science fiction due to the limited number of writers and its transition to a more generalized cultural formation.

History and origins 
The origins of cyberpunk are rooted in the New Wave science fiction movement of the 1960s and 1970s, where New Worlds, under the editorship of Michael Moorcock, began inviting and encouraging stories that examined new writing styles, techniques, and archetypes. Reacting to conventional storytelling, New Wave authors attempted to present a world where society coped with a constant upheaval of new technology and culture, generally with dystopian outcomes. Writers like Roger Zelazny, J. G. Ballard, Philip José Farmer, Samuel R. Delany, and Harlan Ellison often examined the impact of drug culture, technology, and the sexual revolution with an avant-garde style influenced by the Beat Generation (especially William S. Burroughs' science fiction writing), Dadaism, and their own ideas. Ballard attacked the idea that stories should follow the "archetypes" popular since the time of Ancient Greece, and the assumption that these would somehow be the same ones that would call to modern readers, as Joseph Campbell argued in The Hero with a Thousand Faces. Instead, Ballard wanted to write a new myth for the modern reader, a style with "more psycho-literary ideas, more meta-biological and meta-chemical concepts, private time systems, synthetic psychologies and space-times, more of the sombre half-worlds one glimpses in the paintings of schizophrenics."

This had a profound influence on a new generation of writers, some of whom would come to call their movement "cyberpunk". One, Bruce Sterling, later said:

Ballard, Zelazny, and the rest of New Wave was seen by the subsequent generation as delivering more "realism" to science fiction, and they attempted to build on this.

Samuel R. Delany's 1968 novel Nova is also considered one of the major forerunners of the cyberpunk movement. It prefigures, for instance, cyberpunk's staple trope of human interfacing with computers via implants. Writer William Gibson claimed to be greatly influenced by Delany, and his novel Neuromancer includes allusions to Nova.

Similarly influential, and generally cited as proto-cyberpunk, is the Philip K. Dick novel Do Androids Dream of Electric Sheep, first published in 1968. Presenting precisely the general feeling of dystopian post-economic-apocalyptic future as Gibson and Sterling later deliver, it examines ethical and moral problems with cybernetic, artificial intelligence in a way more "realist" than the Isaac Asimov Robot series that laid its philosophical foundation. Dick's protege and friend K. W. Jeter wrote a novel called Dr. Adder in 1972 that, Dick lamented, might have been more influential in the field had it been able to find a publisher at that time. It was not published until 1984, after which Jeter made it the first book in a trilogy, followed by The Glass Hammer (1985) and Death Arms (1987). Jeter wrote other standalone cyberpunk novels before going on to write three authorized sequels to Do Androids Dream of Electric Sheep, named Blade Runner 2: The Edge of Human (1995), Blade Runner 3: Replicant Night (1996), and Blade Runner 4: Eye and Talon.

Do Androids Dream of Electric Sheep was made into the seminal movie Blade Runner, released in 1982. This was one year after William Gibson's story, "Johnny Mnemonic" helped move proto-cyberpunk concepts into the mainstream. That story, which also became a film years later in 1995, involves another dystopian future, where human couriers deliver computer data, stored cybernetically in their own minds.

The term cyberpunk first appeared as the title of a short story written by Bruce Bethke, written in 1980 and published in Amazing Stories in 1983. It was picked up by Gardner Dozois, editor of Isaac Asimov's Science Fiction Magazine, and popularized in his editorials.

Bethke says he made two lists of words, one for technology, one for troublemakers, and experimented with combining them variously into compound words, consciously attempting to coin a term that encompassed both punk attitudes and high technology. He described the idea thus:

Afterward, Dozois began using this term in his own writing, most notably in a Washington Post article where he said "About the closest thing here to a self-willed esthetic 'school' would be the purveyors of bizarre hard-edged, high-tech stuff, who have on occasion been referred to as 'cyberpunks'—Sterling, Gibson, Shiner, Cadigan, Bear."

About that time in 1984, William Gibson's novel Neuromancer was published, delivering a glimpse of a future encompassed by what became an archetype of cyberpunk "virtual reality", with the human mind being fed light-based worldscapes through a computer interface. Some, perhaps ironically including Bethke himself, argued at the time that the writers whose style Gibson's books epitomized should be called "Neuromantics", a pun on the name of the novel plus "New Romantics", a term used for a New Wave pop music movement that had just occurred in Britain, but this term did not catch on. Bethke later paraphrased Michael Swanwick's argument for the term: "the movement writers should properly be termed neuromantics, since so much of what they were doing was clearly imitating Neuromancer".

Sterling was another writer who played a central role, often consciously, in the cyberpunk genre, variously seen as either keeping it on track, or distorting its natural path into a stagnant formula. In 1986 he edited a volume of cyberpunk stories called Mirrorshades: The Cyberpunk Anthology, an attempt to establish what cyberpunk was, from Sterling's perspective.

In the subsequent decade, the motifs of Gibson's Neuromancer became formulaic, climaxing in the satirical extremes of Neal Stephenson's Snow Crash in 1992.

Bookending the cyberpunk era, Bethke himself published a novel in 1995 called Headcrash, like Snow Crash a satirical attack on the genre's excesses. Fittingly, it won an honor named after cyberpunk's spiritual founder, the Philip K. Dick Award.

It satirized the genre in this way:

The impact of cyberpunk, though, has been long-lasting. Elements of both the setting and storytelling have become normal in science fiction in general, and a slew of sub-genres now have -punk tacked onto their names, most obviously steampunk, but also a host of other cyberpunk derivatives.

Style and ethos 
Primary figures in the cyberpunk movement include William Gibson, Neal Stephenson, Bruce Sterling, Bruce Bethke, Pat Cadigan, Rudy Rucker, and John Shirley. Philip K. Dick (author of Do Androids Dream of Electric Sheep?, from which the film Blade Runner was adapted) is also seen by some as prefiguring the movement.

Blade Runner can be seen as a quintessential example of the cyberpunk style and theme. Video games, board games, and tabletop role-playing games, such as Cyberpunk 2020 and Shadowrun, often feature storylines that are heavily influenced by cyberpunk writing and movies. Beginning in the early 1990s, some trends in fashion and music were also labeled as cyberpunk. Cyberpunk is also featured prominently in anime and manga (Japanese cyberpunk), with Akira, Ghost in the Shell and Cowboy Bebop being among the most notable.

Setting 

Cyberpunk writers tend to use elements from crime fiction—particularly hardboiled detective fiction and film noir—and postmodernist prose to describe an often nihilistic underground side of an electronic society. The genre's vision of a troubled future is often called the antithesis of the generally utopian visions of the future popular in the 1940s and 1950s. Gibson defined cyberpunk's antipathy towards utopian science fiction in his 1981 short story "The Gernsback Continuum," which pokes fun at and, to a certain extent, condemns utopian science fiction.

In some cyberpunk writing, much of the action takes place online, in cyberspace, blurring the line between actual and virtual reality. A typical trope in such work is a direct connection between the human brain and computer systems. Cyberpunk settings are dystopias with corruption, computers and internet connectivity. Giant, multinational corporations have for the most part replaced governments as centers of political, economic, and even military power.

The economic and technological state of Japan is a regular theme in the cyberpunk literature of the 1980s. Of Japan's influence on the genre, William Gibson said, "Modern Japan simply was cyberpunk." Cyberpunk is often set in urbanized, artificial landscapes, and "city lights, receding" was used by Gibson as one of the genre's first metaphors for cyberspace and virtual reality. The cityscapes of Hong Kong has had major influences in the urban backgrounds, ambiance and settings in many cyberpunk works such as Blade Runner and Shadowrun. Ridley Scott envisioned the landscape of cyberpunk Los Angeles in Blade Runner to be "Hong Kong on a very bad day". The streetscapes of the Ghost in the Shell film were based on Hong Kong. Its director Mamoru Oshii felt that Hong Kong's strange and chaotic streets where "old and new exist in confusing relationships", fit the theme of the film well. Hong Kong's Kowloon Walled City is particularly notable for its disorganized hyper-urbanization and breakdown in traditional urban planning to be an inspiration to cyberpunk landscapes. Portrayals of East Asia and Asians in Western cyberpunk have been criticized as Orientalist and promoting racist tropes playing on American and European fears of East Asian dominance; this has been referred to as "techno-Orientalism".

Protagonists 
One of the cyberpunk genre's prototype characters is Case, from Gibson's Neuromancer. Case is a "console cowboy," a brilliant drug addicted hacker who has betrayed his organized criminal partners. Robbed of his talent through a crippling injury inflicted by the vengeful partners, Case unexpectedly receives a once-in-a-lifetime opportunity to be healed by expert medical care but only if he participates in another criminal enterprise with a new crew.

Like Case, many cyberpunk protagonists are manipulated or forced into situations where they have little or no control. They often begin their story with little to no power, starting in roles of subordinates or burnouts. The story usually involves them breaking out of these lowly roles early on. They typically have bittersweet or negative endings, rarely make great gains by the end of the story.

Protagonists often fit into the role of outcasts, criminals, misfits and malcontents, expressing the "punk" component of cyberpunk. Due to the morally ambiguous nature of the worlds they inhabit, cyberpunk protagonists are usually antiheroes. They often engage with their society's drug subcultures or some other vice. Though they may morally or ethically oppose some of the more bleak aspects of their worlds, they are often too pragmatic or defeated to change them.

Society and government 
Cyberpunk can be intended to disquiet readers and call them to action. It often expresses a sense of rebellion, suggesting that one could describe it as a type of cultural revolution in science fiction. In the words of author and critic David Brin:

...a closer look [at cyberpunk authors] reveals that they nearly always portray future societies in which governments have become wimpy and pathetic ...Popular science fiction tales by Gibson, Williams, Cadigan and others do depict Orwellian accumulations of power in the next century, but nearly always clutched in the secretive hands of a wealthy or corporate elite.

Cyberpunk stories have also been seen as fictional forecasts of the evolution of the Internet. The earliest descriptions of a global communications network came long before the World Wide Web entered popular awareness, though not before traditional science-fiction writers such as Arthur C. Clarke and some social commentators such as James Burke began predicting that such networks would eventually form.

Some observers cite that cyberpunk tends to marginalize sectors of society such as women and Africans. It is claimed that, for instance, cyberpunk depicts fantasies that ultimately empower masculinity using fragmentary and decentered aesthetic that culminate in a masculine genre populated by male outlaws. Critics also note the absence of any reference to Africa or an African-American character in the quintessential cyberpunk film Blade Runner while other films reinforce stereotypes.

Media

Literature 

Minnesota writer Bruce Bethke coined the term in 1983 for his short story "Cyberpunk," which was published in an issue of Amazing Science Fiction Stories. The term was quickly appropriated as a label to be applied to the works of William Gibson, Bruce Sterling, Pat Cadigan and others. Of these, Sterling became the movement's chief ideologue, thanks to his fanzine Cheap Truth. John Shirley wrote articles on Sterling and Rucker's significance. John Brunner's 1975 novel The Shockwave Rider is considered by many to be the first cyberpunk novel with many of the tropes commonly associated with the genre, some five years before the term was popularized by Dozois.

William Gibson with his novel Neuromancer (1984) is arguably the most famous writer connected with the term cyberpunk. He emphasized style, a fascination with surfaces, and atmosphere over traditional science-fiction tropes. Regarded as ground-breaking and sometimes as "the archetypal cyberpunk work," Neuromancer was awarded the Hugo, Nebula, and Philip K. Dick Awards. Count Zero (1986) and Mona Lisa Overdrive (1988) followed after Gibson's popular debut novel. According to the Jargon File, "Gibson's near-total ignorance of computers and the present-day hacker culture enabled him to speculate about the role of computers and hackers in the future in ways hackers have since found both irritatingly naïve and tremendously stimulating."

Early on, cyberpunk was hailed as a radical departure from science-fiction standards and a new manifestation of vitality. Shortly thereafter, however, some critics arose to challenge its status as a revolutionary movement. These critics said that the science fiction New Wave of the 1960s was much more innovative as far as narrative techniques and styles were concerned. Furthermore, while Neuromancer's narrator may have had an unusual "voice" for science fiction, much older examples can be found: Gibson's narrative voice, for example, resembles that of an updated Raymond Chandler, as in his novel The Big Sleep (1939). Others noted that almost all traits claimed to be uniquely cyberpunk could in fact be found in older writers' works—often citing J. G. Ballard, Philip K. Dick, Harlan Ellison, Stanisław Lem, Samuel R. Delany, and even William S. Burroughs. For example, Philip K. Dick's works contain recurring themes of social decay, artificial intelligence, paranoia, and blurred lines between objective and subjective realities. The influential cyberpunk movie Blade Runner (1982) is based on his book, Do Androids Dream of Electric Sheep?. Humans linked to machines are found in Pohl and Kornbluth's Wolfbane (1959) and Roger Zelazny's Creatures of Light and Darkness (1968).

In 1994, scholar Brian Stonehill suggested that Thomas Pynchon's 1973 novel Gravity's Rainbow "not only curses but precurses what we now glibly dub cyberspace." Other important predecessors include Alfred Bester's two most celebrated novels, The Demolished Man and The Stars My Destination, as well as Vernor Vinge's novella True Names.

Reception and impact 
Science-fiction writer David Brin describes cyberpunk as "the finest free promotion campaign ever waged on behalf of science fiction." It may not have attracted the "real punks," but it did ensnare many new readers, and it provided the sort of movement that postmodern literary critics found alluring. Cyberpunk made science fiction more attractive to academics, argues Brin; in addition, it made science fiction more profitable to Hollywood and to the visual arts generally. Although the "self-important rhetoric and whines of persecution" on the part of cyberpunk fans were irritating at worst and humorous at best, Brin declares that the "rebels did shake things up. We owe them a debt."

Fredric Jameson considers cyberpunk the "supreme literary expression if not of postmodernism, then of late capitalism itself".

Cyberpunk further inspired many professional writers who were not among the "original" cyberpunks to incorporate cyberpunk ideas into their own works, such as George Alec Effinger's When Gravity Fails. Wired magazine, created by Louis Rossetto and Jane Metcalfe, mixes new technology, art, literature, and current topics in order to interest today's cyberpunk fans, which Paula Yoo claims "proves that hardcore hackers, multimedia junkies, cyberpunks and cellular freaks are poised to take over the world."

Film and television 

The film Blade Runner (1982)—adapted from Philip K. Dick's Do Androids Dream of Electric Sheep?—is set in 2019 in a dystopian future in which manufactured beings called replicants are slaves used on space colonies and are legal prey on Earth to various bounty hunters who "retire" (kill) them. Although Blade Runner was largely unsuccessful in its first theatrical release, it found a viewership in the home video market and became a cult film. Since the movie omits the religious and mythical elements of Dick's original novel (e.g. empathy boxes and Wilbur Mercer), it falls more strictly within the cyberpunk genre than the novel does. William Gibson would later reveal that upon first viewing the film, he was surprised at how the look of this film matched his vision for Neuromancer, a book he was then working on. The film's tone has since been the staple of many cyberpunk movies, such as The Matrix trilogy (1999–2003), which uses a wide variety of cyberpunk elements.

The number of films in the genre or at least using a few genre elements has grown steadily since Blade Runner. Several of Philip K. Dick's works have been adapted to the silver screen. The films Johnny Mnemonic and New Rose Hotel, both based upon short stories by William Gibson, flopped commercially and critically. These box offices misses significantly slowed the development of cyberpunk as a literary or cultural form although a sequel to the 1982 film Blade Runner was released in October 2017 with Harrison Ford reprising his role from the original film. A rigorous implementation of all core cyberpunk hallmarks is the TV series Max Headroom from 1987, playing in a futuristic dystopia ruled by an oligarchy of television networks, and where computer hacking played a central role in many story lines. Max Headroom has been called "the first cyberpunk television series", with "deep roots in the Western philosophical tradition".

In addition, "tech-noir" film as a hybrid genre, means a work of combining neo-noir and science fiction or cyberpunk. It includes many cyberpunk films such as Blade Runner, Burst City, Robocop, 12 Monkeys, The Lawnmower Man, Hackers, Hardware, and Strange Days, Total Recall.

Anime and manga 

The Japanese cyberpunk subgenre began in 1982 with the debut of Katsuhiro Otomo's manga series Akira, with its 1988 anime film adaptation, which Otomo directed, later popularizing the subgenre. Akira inspired a wave of Japanese cyberpunk works, including manga and anime series such as Ghost in the Shell, Battle Angel Alita, and Cowboy Bebop. Other early Japanese cyberpunk works include the 1982 film Burst City, the 1985 original video animation Megazone 23, and the 1989 film Tetsuo: The Iron Man.

In contrast to Western cyberpunk which has roots in New Wave science fiction literature, Japanese cyberpunk has roots in underground music culture, specifically the Japanese punk subculture that arose from the Japanese punk music scene in the 1970s. The filmmaker Sogo Ishii introduced this subculture to Japanese cinema with the punk film Panic High School (1978) and the punk biker film Crazy Thunder Road (1980), both portraying the rebellion and anarchy associated with punk, and the latter featuring a punk biker gang aesthetic. Ishii's punk films paved the way for Otomo's seminal cyberpunk work Akira.

Cyberpunk themes are widely visible in anime and manga. In Japan, where cosplay is popular and not only teenagers display such fashion styles, cyberpunk has been accepted and its influence is widespread. William Gibson's Neuromancer, whose influence dominated the early cyberpunk movement, was also set in Chiba, one of Japan's largest industrial areas, although at the time of writing the novel Gibson did not know the location of Chiba and had no idea how perfectly it fit his vision in some ways. The exposure to cyberpunk ideas and fiction in the 1980s has allowed it to seep into the Japanese culture.

Cyberpunk anime and manga draw upon a futuristic vision which has elements in common with Western science fiction and therefore have received wide international acceptance outside Japan. "The conceptualization involved in cyberpunk is more of forging ahead, looking at the new global culture. It is a culture that does not exist right now, so the Japanese concept of a cyberpunk future, seems just as valid as a Western one, especially as Western cyberpunk often incorporates many Japanese elements." William Gibson is now a frequent visitor to Japan, and he came to see that many of his visions of Japan have become a reality:

Modern Japan simply was cyberpunk. The Japanese themselves knew it and delighted in it. I remember my first glimpse of Shibuya, when one of the young Tokyo journalists who had taken me there, his face drenched with the light of a thousand media-suns—all that towering, animated crawl of commercial information—said, "You see? You see? It is Blade Runner town." And it was. It so evidently was.

Cyberpunk themes have appeared in many anime and manga, including the ground-breaking  Appleseed, Ghost in the Shell, Ergo Proxy, Megazone 23, Goku Midnight Eye, Cyber City Oedo 808, Cyberpunk: Edgerunners, Bubblegum Crisis, A.D. Police: Dead End City, Angel Cop, Blame!, Armitage III, Texhnolyze, Psycho-Pass and No Guns Life.

Influence 
Akira (1982 manga) and its 1988 anime film adaptation have influenced numerous works in animation, comics, film, music, television and video games. Akira has been cited as a major influence on Hollywood films such as The Matrix, Chronicle, Looper, Midnight Special, and Inception, as well as cyberpunk-influenced video games such as Hideo Kojima's Snatcher and Metal Gear Solid, Valve's Half-Life series and Dontnod Entertainment's Remember Me. Akira has also influenced the work of musicians such as Kanye West, who paid homage to Akira in the "Stronger" music video, and Lupe Fiasco, whose album Tetsuo & Youth is named after Tetsuo Shima. The popular bike from the film, Kaneda's Motorbike, appears in Steven Spielberg'''s film Ready Player One, and CD Projekt's video game Cyberpunk 2077.Ghost in the Shell (1995) influenced a number of prominent filmmakers, most notably the Wachowskis in The Matrix (1999) and its sequels. The Matrix series took several concepts from the film, including the Matrix digital rain, which was inspired by the opening credits of Ghost in the Shell and a sushi magazine the wife of the senior designer of the animation, Simon Witheley, had in the kitchen at the time., and the way characters access the Matrix through holes in the back of their necks. Other parallels have been drawn to James Cameron's Avatar, Steven Spielberg's A.I. Artificial Intelligence, and Jonathan Mostow's Surrogates. James Cameron cited Ghost in the Shell as a source of inspiration, citing it as an influence on Avatar.

The original video animation Megazone 23 (1985) has a number of similarities to The Matrix. Battle Angel Alita (1990) has had a notable influence on filmmaker James Cameron, who was planning to adapt it into a film since 2000. It was an influence on his TV series Dark Angel, and he is the producer of the 2019 film adaptation Alita: Battle Angel.

 Comics 

In 1975, artist Moebius collaborated with writer Dan O'Bannon on a story called The Long Tomorrow, published in the French magazine Métal Hurlant. One of the first works featuring elements now seen as exemplifying cyberpunk, it combined influences from film noir and hardboiled crime fiction with a distant sci-fi environment. Author William Gibson stated that Moebius' artwork for the series, along with other visuals from Métal Hurlant, strongly influenced his 1984 novel Neuromancer. The series had a far-reaching impact in the cyberpunk genre, being cited as an influence on Ridley Scott's Alien (1979) and Blade Runner. Moebius later expanded upon The Long Tomorrow's aesthetic with The Incal, a graphic novel collaboration with Alejandro Jodorowsky published from 1980 to 1988. The story centers around the exploits of a detective named John Difool in various science fiction settings, and while not confined to the tropes of cyberpunk, it features many elements of the genre.

Concurrently with many other foundational cyberpunk works, DC Comics published Frank Miller's six-issue miniseries Rōnin from 1983 to 1984. The series, incorporating aspects of Samurai culture, martial arts films and manga, is set in a dystopian near-future New York. It explores the link between an ancient Japanese warrior and the apocalyptic, crumbling cityscape he finds himself in. The comic also bears several similarities to Akira, with highly powerful telepaths playing central roles, as well as sharing many key visuals.Rōnin would go on to influence many later works, including Samurai Jack and the Teenage Mutant Ninja Turtles, as well as video games such as Cyberpunk 2077. Two years later, Miller himself would incorporate several toned-down elements of Rōnin into his acclaimed 1986 miniseries The Dark Knight Returns, in which a retired Bruce Wayne once again takes up the mantle of Batman in a Gotham that is increasingly becoming more dystopian.

Paul Pope's Batman: Year 100, published in 2006, also exhibits several traits typical of cyberpunk fiction, such as a rebel protagonist opposing a future authoritarian state, and a distinct retrofuturist aesthetic that makes callbacks to both The Dark Knight Returns and Batman's original appearances in  the 1940s.

 Games 

There are many cyberpunk video games. Popular series include Final Fantasy VII and its spin-offs and remake, the Megami Tensei series, Kojima's Snatcher and Metal Gear series, Deus Ex series, Syndicate series, and System Shock and its sequel. Other games, like Blade Runner, Ghost in the Shell, and the Matrix series, are based upon genre movies, or role-playing games (for instance the various Shadowrun games).

Several RPGs called Cyberpunk exist: Cyberpunk, Cyberpunk 2020, Cyberpunk v3.0 and Cyberpunk Red written by Mike Pondsmith and published by R. Talsorian Games, and GURPS Cyberpunk, published by Steve Jackson Games as a module of the GURPS family of RPGs. Cyberpunk 2020 was designed with the settings of William Gibson's writings in mind, and to some extent with his approval, unlike the approach taken by FASA in producing the transgenre Shadowrun game and its various sequels, which mixes cyberpunk with fantasy elements such as magic and fantasy races such as orcs and elves. Both are set in the near future, in a world where cybernetics are prominent. In addition, Iron Crown Enterprises released an RPG named Cyberspace, which was out of print for several years until recently being re-released in online PDF form. CD Projekt Red released Cyberpunk 2077, a cyberpunk open world first-person shooter/role-playing video game (RPG) based on the tabletop RPG Cyberpunk 2020, on December 10, 2020. In 1990, in a convergence of cyberpunk art and reality, the United States Secret Service raided Steve Jackson Games's headquarters and confiscated all their computers. Officials denied that the target had been the GURPS Cyberpunk sourcebook, but Jackson would later write that he and his colleagues "were never able to secure the return of the complete manuscript; [...] The Secret Service at first flatly refused to return anything – then agreed to let us copy files, but when we got to their office, restricted us to one set of out-of-date files – then agreed to make copies for us, but said "tomorrow" every day from March 4 to March 26. On March 26 we received a set of disks which purported to be our files, but the material was late, incomplete and well-nigh useless." Steve Jackson Games won a lawsuit against the Secret Service, aided by the new Electronic Frontier Foundation. This event has achieved a sort of notoriety, which has extended to the book itself as well. All published editions of GURPS Cyberpunk have a tagline on the front cover, which reads "The book that was seized by the U.S. Secret Service!" Inside, the book provides a summary of the raid and its aftermath.

Cyberpunk has also inspired several tabletop, miniature and board games such as Necromunda by Games Workshop. Netrunner is a collectible card game introduced in 1996, based on the Cyberpunk 2020 role-playing game. Tokyo NOVA, debuting in 1993, is a cyberpunk role-playing game that uses playing cards instead of dice.Cyberpunk 2077 set a new record for the largest number of simultaneous players in a single player game, with a record 1,003,262 playing just after the December 10th launch, according to Steam Database. That tops the previous Steam record of 472,962 players set by Fallout 4 back in 2015.

 Music 

Invariably the origin of cyberpunk music lies in the synthesizer-heavy scores of cyberpunk films such as Escape from New York (1981) and Blade Runner (1982). Some musicians and acts have been classified as cyberpunk due to their aesthetic style and musical content. Often dealing with dystopian visions of the future or biomechanical themes, some fit more squarely in the category than others. Bands whose music has been classified as cyberpunk include Psydoll, Front Line Assembly, Clock DVA, Angelspit and Sigue Sigue Sputnik.

Some musicians not normally associated with cyberpunk have at times been inspired to create concept albums exploring such themes. Albums such as the British musician and songwriter Gary Numan's Replicas, The Pleasure Principle and Telekon were heavily inspired by the works of Philip K. Dick. Kraftwerk's The Man-Machine and Computer World albums both explored the theme of humanity becoming dependent on technology. Nine Inch Nails' concept album Year Zero also fits into this category. Fear Factory concept albums are heavily based upon future dystopia, cybernetics, clash between man and machines, virtual worlds. Billy Idol's Cyberpunk drew heavily from cyberpunk literature and the cyberdelic counter culture in its creation. 1. Outside, a cyberpunk narrative fueled concept album by David Bowie, was warmly met by critics upon its release in 1995. Many musicians have also taken inspiration from specific cyberpunk works or authors, including Sonic Youth, whose albums Sister and Daydream Nation take influence from the works of Philip K. Dick and William Gibson respectively. Madonna's 2001 Drowned World Tour opened with a cyberpunk section, where costumes, asethetics and stage props were used to accentuate the dystopian nature of the theatrical concert. Lady Gaga used a cyberpunk-persona and visual style for her sixth studio album Chromatica (2020).

Vaporwave and synthwave are also influenced by cyberpunk. The former has been inspired by one of the messages of cyberpunk and is interpreted as a dystopian critique of capitalism in the vein of cyberpunk and the latter is more surface-level, inspired only by the aesthetic of cyberpunk as a nostalgic retrofuturistic revival of aspects of cyberpunk's origins.

 Social impact 
 Art and architecture 

Writers David Suzuki and Holly Dressel describe the cafes, brand-name stores and video arcades of the Sony Center in the Potsdamer Platz public square of Berlin, Germany, as "a vision of a cyberpunk, corporate urban future".

 Society and counterculture 
Several subcultures have been inspired by cyberpunk fiction. These include the cyberdelic counter culture of the late 1980s and early 1990s. Cyberdelic, whose adherents referred to themselves as "cyberpunks", attempted to blend the psychedelic art and drug movement with the technology of cyberculture. Early adherents included Timothy Leary, Mark Frauenfelder and R. U. Sirius. The movement largely faded following the dot-com bubble implosion of 2000.

Cybergoth is a fashion and dance subculture which draws its inspiration from cyberpunk fiction, as well as rave and Gothic subcultures. In addition, a distinct cyberpunk fashion of its own has emerged in recent years which rejects the raver and goth influences of cybergoth, and draws inspiration from urban street fashion, "post apocalypse", functional clothing, high tech sports wear, tactical uniform and multifunction. This fashion goes by names like "tech wear", "goth ninja" or "tech ninja".

The Kowloon Walled City in Hong Kong (demolished in 1994) is often referenced as the model cyberpunk/dystopian slum as, given its poor living conditions at the time coupled with the city's political, physical, and economic isolation has caused many in academia to be fascinated by the ingenuity of its spawning.

 Related genres 

As a wider variety of writers began to work with cyberpunk concepts, new subgenres of science fiction emerged, some of which could be considered as playing off the cyberpunk label, others which could be considered as legitimate explorations into newer territory. These focused on technology and its social effects in different ways. One prominent subgenre is "steampunk," which is set in an alternate history Victorian era that combines anachronistic technology with cyberpunk's bleak film noir world view. The term was originally coined around 1987 as a joke to describe some of the novels of Tim Powers, James P. Blaylock, and K.W. Jeter, but by the time Gibson and Sterling entered the subgenre with their collaborative novel The Difference Engine'' the term was being used earnestly as well.

Another subgenre is "biopunk" (cyberpunk themes dominated by biotechnology) from the early 1990s, a derivative style building on biotechnology rather than informational technology. In these stories, people are changed in some way not by mechanical means, but by genetic manipulation.

Cyberpunk works have been described as well situated within postmodern literature.

Registered trademark status 

In the United States, the term "Cyberpunk" is a registered trademark by R. Talsorian Games Inc. for its tabletop role-playing game.

Within the European Union, the "Cyberpunk" trademark is owned by two parties: CD Projekt SA for "games and online gaming services" (particularly for the video game adaptation of the former) and by Sony Music for use outside games.

See also 

 Corporate warfare
 Cyborg
 Digital dystopia
 Postcyberpunk
 Posthumanization
 Steampunk
 Solarpunk
 Transhumanism
 Type 1 civilization
 Utopian and dystopian fiction

References

External links

 Cyberpunk on The Encyclopedia of Science Fiction
 The Cyberpunk Directory—Comprehensive directory of cyberpunk resources
 Cyberpunk Media Archive Archive of cyberpunk media
 The Cyberpunk Project—A project dedicated toward maintaining a cyberpunk database, library, and other information
 cyberpunks.com A website dedicated to cyberpunk themed news and media

 
Dystopian fiction
Subcultures
Postmodernism
Postmodern art
Science fiction culture
1960s neologisms
Government by algorithm in fiction